Compartmentalization, in information security, whether public or private, is the limiting of access to information to persons or other entities on a need-to-know basis to perform certain tasks.

It originated in the handling of classified information in military and intelligence applications. It dates back to antiquity, and was successfully used to keep the secret of Greek fire.

The basis for compartmentalization is the idea that, if fewer people know the details of a mission or task, the risk or likelihood that such information will be compromised or fall into the hands of the opposition is decreased. Hence, varying levels of clearance within organizations exist. Yet, even if someone has the highest clearance, certain "compartmentalized" information, identified by codewords referring to particular types of secret information, may still be restricted to certain operators, even with a lower overall security clearance. Information marked this way is said to be codeword–classified. One famous example of this was the Ultra secret, where documents were marked "Top Secret Ultra": "Top Secret" marked its security level, and the "Ultra" keyword further restricted its readership to only those cleared to read "Ultra" documents.

Compartmentalization is now also used in commercial security engineering as a technique to protect information such as medical records.

Example
An example of compartmentalization was the Manhattan Project. Personnel at Oak Ridge constructed and operated centrifuges to isolate uranium-235 from naturally occurring uranium, but most did not know exactly what they were doing. Those that knew did not know why they were doing it. Parts of the weapon were separately designed by teams who did not know how the parts interacted.

See also
 Information sensitivity
 Principle of least privilege
 Read into
 Sensitive compartmented information

References

 

Data security
National security
Classified information
Intelligence assessment